This was the 2007 IIHF World Women's U18 Championships Qualification. It decided the teams that participated in the 2008 IIHF World Women's U18 Championship.

Group A was held in Vierumäki, Finland from February 9–11, 2007, Group B was held in Nymburk, Czech Republic from February 9–11, 2007, and Group C was held in Bad Tölz, Bavaria, Germany from February 16–18, 2007.

Qualification tournament

Group A

Group B

Group C

Qualified teams

References
 IIHF
 Tournament on hockeyarchives.info

Qual
World
World
World
World
2006
2006
2006
Qualification for sports events
IIHF World Women's U18 Championship Qualification
Nymburk
Ice hockey in Bavaria
IIHF World Women's U18 Championship Qualification, 2007